The Scarlet Oath is a 1916 American silent drama film directed by Frank Powell and Travers Vale and starring Gail Kane, Philip Hahn and Carleton Macy.

Cast
 Gail Kane as Olga Pavloff / Nina Pavloff
 Philip Hahn as Ivan Pavloff
 Carleton Macy as Victor Karenin 
 Lillian Paige as Mrs. Victor Krenin
 Alan Hale as John Huntington
 Montagu Love as Nicholas Savaroff
 Boris Korlin as Caganov

References

Bibliography
 George A. Katchmer. Eighty Silent Film Stars: Biographies and Filmographies of the Obscure to the Well Known. McFarland, 1991.

External links
 

1916 films
1916 drama films
1910s English-language films
American silent feature films
Silent American drama films
American black-and-white films
Films directed by Frank Powell
Films directed by Travers Vale
World Film Company films
1910s American films
English-language drama films